Gojra is a tehsil in Toba Tek Singh District,  Punjab, Pakistan. The tehsil covers an area of 1,115 km2, and is administratively subdivided into 24 Union Councils, six of which form the tehsil capital Gojra.

References

Toba Tek Singh District
Tehsils of Punjab, Pakistan